Genius is a BBC Radio 4 comedy gameshow presented by comedian Dave Gorman. Listeners send in 'genius' ideas which are considered by Gorman and a guest before a studio audience, with a different guest for each show. One series of five episodes was broadcast between 27 October and 24 November 2005, with a second series of six episodes broadcast between 7 September and 12 October 2006 and a third series between 1 October and 5 November 2007. A Christmas special was broadcast on 22 December 2008. An unbroadcast television pilot was made in November 2007, with a full series recorded for BBC Two in September 2008.

The series was created by Ali Crockatt and David Scott, and is produced by Simon Nicholls.

Rules
People send their ideas to Genius and, if chosen, travel to a recording of the show to put forward their idea to the audience. Superficially, the idea must have some quality by which it will improve the standard of living either for the individual or society at large, although in reality, it is more important that the idea has comedic value. An early addition to the rules was that evil genius should count. Most ideas are created by one person, however it is possible for an idea to be made by more than one person. There are normally five different ideas on every episode, but this has been known to differ.

The idea can be anything, such as an invention, a law or a government policy. The idea does not have to be very expensive, or even ethical. Some ideas are constructed or otherwise trialled in real life, and the consequences are played out to their extremes, with the host usually attempting to identify a flaw in each idea. The guest then decides if the idea is "Genius or not".

Once all the ideas have been put forward, the guest then picks his/her two favourites. The winner out of these two is chosen by the audience, by applauding for their choice. The one with the loudest applause wins the "coveted" Genius trophy. Since series two, the winner also reads the end credits.

However, one of the winning ideas at the end of the third series was to change the voting system of the show. A person complained that the second idea had an unfair advantage because they knew how much louder they needed to clap. In the following episode, the Christmas Special, the winning idea was instead decided by the guest judge within a 10-second time limit.

Episodes

Series 1 (2005)

Series 2 (2006)

Series 3 (2007)

Christmas Special (2008)

TV series (2009)

A television series of Genius was recorded and the first series was broadcast on BBC Two from 20 March 2009. A second series started recording on 23 May 2010 and was broadcast later that year.

References

External links

BBC Radio 4 programmes
BBC Radio comedy programmes
British radio game shows
2000s British game shows
2005 radio programme debuts
2008 radio programme endings
Radio programs adapted into television shows